The 1945 local elections in Ireland were held on 14 June 1945 to fill all council seats for most counties and county boroughs and municipal towns. The state was still under the Emergency of the Second World War. As a cost-saving measure, electoral law was amended to bring forward the date of the local elections a few weeks to coincide with the 1945 presidential election.

Dublin County Council and Kerry County Council had been dissolved, and no elections were held for their councils. There was no poll for six urban district councils and four town commissioners because the number of candidates did not exceed the number of seats.

Results 
The elections were by single transferable vote. The total valid votes cast was 1,152,691. Totals of invalid votes were not aggregated from local counts. Fianna Fáil lost votes to Independents. Prior to the 1960s, Fine Gael did not contest local elections in all areas; some of those who voted for it in Dáil elections voted at local elections for local groups including the Cork Civic Party and Limerick Progressive Party.

Notes

References

Sources
  ( only Sligo County Council results are available.)

Citations

Local elections
1945 elections in Europe
1945